Bruce Spence (born 17 September 1945) is a New Zealand–Australian actor. Spence has amassed over 100 film and television credits and has also acted in theatre.

Biography
Spence won an AFI Award for Best Actor for his role in the 1971 comedy Stork.

Spence's best known film role is as the gyrocopter pilot in Mad Max 2 (1981). He also played the lead role in Werner Herzog's Where the Green Ants Dream (1984) and portrayed Jedediah the pilot in Mad Max Beyond Thunderdome (1985).

In the 21st century, Spence played the Mouth of Sauron in The Lord of the Rings: The Return of the King (2003), the Trainman in The Matrix Revolutions (2003), and Baxter in Disney's Inspector Gadget 2 (2003), and voiced the character Chum in Finding Nemo (2003). He also portrayed Tion Medon in Star Wars: Episode III – Revenge of the Sith (2005) and played Lord Rhoop in The Chronicles of Narnia: The Voyage of the Dawn Treader (2010).

Spence portrayed the palaeontologist (Huxley) in the Australian performance of BBC's Walking with Dinosaurs: The Live Experience. In his role, Spence narrated the activities of life-sized mechanical dinosaurs operated by teams of puppeteers and drivers.

In 2008, Spence joined the television series Legend of the Seeker, which was based on the Sword of Truth series by Terry Goodkind. He played the role of Zeddicus Zu'l Zorander, co-starring with Craig Horner and Bridget Regan. The show ran for two seasons.

In 2014, Spence played prison inmate George Corella in episode 3.1 of Rake.

Filmography

Film

Television

Video games

References

External links

Best Actor AACTA Award winners
1945 births
Living people
New Zealand male film actors
New Zealand male television actors
New Zealand male video game actors
New Zealand male voice actors
People educated at Henderson High School, Auckland
Australian male film actors
Australian male comedians
Australian male television actors